= Arnold Horrex Rowbotham =

American historian

- Born: 20 February 1888; Birmingham, England
- Died: 14 February 1970 (aged 81); Berkeley, Alameda County, California, United States
- Occupation: Historian

Arnold Horrex Rowbotham (20 Feb 1888 – 14 Feb 1970) was a British-born American historian, bestselling author and university professor.

== Biography ==
He was born on 20 Feb 1888 in Birmingham, West Midlands, England to John Crosby Rowbotham and Margaret Ann Rowbotham.

He married Leda Rosina Liggett in 1916.

He died on 14 Feb 1970 aged 81, in Berkeley, Alameda County, California, United States.

== Education ==
He completed his bachelor's and master's degree in history.

== Career ==
He served as a Professor of Humanities at the University of California, Berkeley.

He also worked in the French Department of Tsinghua University in Beijing.

== Bibliography ==
His notable books include:

- Missionary and Mandarin: The Jesuits at the Court of China
- The Literary Works of Count de Gobineau
- China and the Age of Enlightment in Europe
- Rudyard Kipling and France
- Cansoun de Sant Alexis: A modern Provençal parody
